The Territorial Air Defence Force abbreviated as DAT) is an armed service/branch of the Algerian People's National Army, the armed forces of Algeria. It is one of the four service branches of the Algerian Armed Forces, along with the army, navy, and air force. It is tasked with the Algerian airspace protection mission. Its current commander is Major-General Amer Amrani.

The higher military school of the Air Defence Forces (école supérieure de la défense aérienne du territoire) is located at Reghaïa in Algeria's 1st Military Region. It provides engineering training.

Created in 1988, after being separated from the Ground Forces Command, it is currently under the command of the commander of air defense of the military region forces. Its equipment includes the S300 missile,  batteries of Pantsir-S1s, and the Tor missile system, which is the most important weapon owned by the Territorial Air Defence Force. Other systems include: the SA-6 "Gainful" and Buk missile systems, the S-125 Neva/Pechora and the SA-8 Gecko, as well as the "Shilka" armed with 23 mm cannons and man portable 9K32 Strela-2s. In addition, the force possesses many types of radar.

Currently there are three air defence brigades and five surface-to-air missile regiments with SA-2, SA-3, SA-6, and SA-20.

Equipment

References

External links
 
 

Military of Algeria
Air defence forces
1988 establishments in Algeria